The Comstock Saloon is a historic saloon in San Francisco, California. Located in San Francisco's North Beach, and was founded in 1907. The bar is named after Henry Comstock and for his Comstock Lode. The building itself was home to the oldest microbrewery in San Francisco, San Francisco Brewing Company (1907-2012). Currently, it is owned by Jeff Hollinger and Jonny Raglin, both also bartenders for Absinthe Brasserie & Bar.

References

External links
 Comstock Saloon

1907 establishments in California
Buildings and structures in San Francisco
Drinking establishments in the San Francisco Bay Area
North Beach, San Francisco
Restaurants in San Francisco
Restaurants established in 1907